Gynura is a genus of flowering plants in the daisy family Asteraceae native to Asia. The best known species is Gynura aurantiaca,  often grown as a house plant. This plant is commonly known as purple passion because of the velvety purple leaves.

 Species

References 

 
Asteraceae genera